Beyond Undeniable Entropy is the debut EP by Spanish extreme metal band Hybrid, originally released in 2006 by Deadwrong Records; a six song EP of the band's sound "avant-garde extreme metal that mixes brutal death metal, black metal, doom, crust, grindcore and even latin, bossa nova and crazy free jazz."

Track listing 

"Ave Phoenix" – 2:53
"Sleep of the Defeated" – 3:55
"Sun Burnt" – 2:53
"Insomnia" – 3:35
"Growing Misanthropy" – 3:52
"Throne of the Necronaut" – 4:20

Personnel 

 Unai García – vocals
 J. Oliver – guitar, backing vocals
 Miguel – guitar, backing vocals
 Kike – bass
 Chus Maestro – drums, backing vocals

References

External links
 Hybrid at MySpace

Hybrid (Spanish band) albums
2006 debut EPs
Avant-garde metal albums